Gorky Park is a 1983 American mystery thriller film based on the book of the same name by Martin Cruz Smith. The film was directed by Michael Apted. 

The film stars William Hurt as Arkady Renko, Lee Marvin as Jack Osborne, Joanna Pacula as Irina Asanova, Rikki Fulton as Major Pribluda, Brian Dennehy as William Kirwill, Ian McDiarmid as Professor Andreev, Michael Elphick as Pasha and Ian Bannen as Prosecutor Iamskoy. The plot follows Renko, a Moscow police investigator, on the trail of a gruesome triple murder that leads him into a web of government corruption.

Upon release, Gorky Park was a box office disappointment, barely earning back its $15 million budget, but received positive reviews from critics. Pacuła was nominated for a Golden Globe Award for Best Supporting Actress in a Motion Picture and Elphick for a BAFTA Award for Best Supporting Actor. Dennis Potter won a 1984 Edgar Award for his screenplay for the film.

Plot
Moscow militsiya officer Arkady Renko is called to the site of three dead bodies – two men and one woman – in a secluded clearing near the Gorky Park ice rink. All have been shot in the chest and their faces and finger tips removed; the two men were also shot in the mouth. Renko becomes anxious when the KGB refuses to take over the investigation. Renko traces the woman's skates to a movie set worker, Irina Asanova, who claims that they were stolen. Based on the forensics, the pathologist identifies one young man as a foreigner, likely an American. Renko asks Professor Levi Andreev to reconstruct the faces of the woman and the American man.

At the dacha of Chief Prosecutor Iamskoy, Renko makes the acquaintance of American sable importer Jack Osborne, who is accompanied by Asanova. Renko also crosses paths with William Kirwill, a New York detective who is investigating the disappearance of his brother James.

Renko eventually identifies the victims: James Kirwill and two friends of Asanova. He discovers that they were constructing a chest for Osborne. Renko's suspicion of Osborne mounts following several polite but tense conversations in social settings. When a KGB officer attempts to kill Asanova with an injected overdose, Renko saves her. Nursing her, they become involved romantically although she doesn't entirely trust him. Kirwill finally finds out about Osborne's chest. It was designed to smuggle out six live sables and break the Soviet monopoly, potentially earning Osborne millions. Osborne had promised Asanova's friends to smuggle them out of the Soviet Union; he tells Asanova her friend is in Manhattan.

Renko confronts Asanova with Prof. Andreev's reconstructed head of her female friend, forcing her to accept they have been murdered. She confesses to the plot and flees. Renko and Kirwill go to retrieve the second reconstructed head, but a KGB agent emerges with it. They follow him to Iamskoy's dacha and watch as Osborne and Iamskoy supervise the head's destruction. To Kirwill's horror, it is his brother's head, but they overhear a deal between Osborne and Iamskoy. Renko confronts Iamskoy in a bath house and Iamskoy admits that he kept Renko on the case to force Osborne to pay a larger bribe to smuggle out the sables. He offers to cut Renko in, but Renko reveals that he has recorded their conversation. Iamskoy wrestles Renko for his gun, which goes off and kills Iamskoy.

Osborne flees to Stockholm. The KGB allows Renko to travel to supervise an exchange. He is to receive the sables from Osborne and kill them and Osborne. Renko meets Osborne at his apartment and finds Asanova there. She confesses that she fled to Osborne, who has included her freedom in the deal, and promises Renko that his freedom can also be included. She reveals that Osborne is planning a double cross as he has 12 sables, not just six. Renko meets with Kirwill and they predict that, following the exchange, the KGB will kill Asanova, Renko and Osborne. Kirwill agrees to be at the exchange to help Renko and Asanova.

The next morning, Renko and three KGB agents meet Osborne at a farm. They come across Kirwill's body tied to a tree with his intestines hanging out. Osborne announces that he gutted Kirwill after Kirwill killed his dogs. Osborne produces six dead sables and asks the men to lower their weapons. Renko realizes that neither side will let the other live. When Osborne shoots a KGB agent, Renko grabs Asanova and runs for the woods. KGB Major Pribluda then kills the other KGB agent before Osborne kills Pribluda.

Osborne tries to shoot Renko, who finds live sables in cages. Asanova emerges from the woods and Osborne threatens to kill her if Renko does not surrender. When Renko emerges to give up, Asanova shoots Osborne. Renko, too, shoots Osborne before Asanova kills Osborne. She asks Renko to go away with her, but Renko reveals he agreed to kill Osborne in return for her safety and freedom from the Soviet Union, and that they would both be killed if Renko did not return. Renko returns to his job in Moscow.

Renko ends up freeing the sables, which run off into the woods as Asanova's voice repeats Renko's promise that they will meet again one day.

Cast
 William Hurt as Officer Arkady Renko  
 Lee Marvin as Jack Osborne  
 Brian Dennehy as Detective William Kirwill  
 Ian Bannen as Chief Prosecutor Andrei Iamskoy  
 Joanna Pacula as Irina Asanova  
 Michael Elphick as Pasha Pavlovich
 Richard Griffiths as Anton  
 Rikki Fulton as Major Pribluda  
 Alexander Knox as The General
 Alexei Sayle as Golodkin  
 Ian McDiarmid as Professor Levi Andreev  
 Niall O'Brien as KGB Agent Rurik
 Henry Woolf as Levin
 Jukka Hirvikangas as James Kirwill
 Marjatta Nissinen as Valerya Davidova
 Heikki Leppänen as Kostia Borodin
 Elsa Salamas as Babushka 
 Anatoli Davydov as KGB Agent Nicky

Filming
Gene Kirkwood and Howard W. ("Hawk") Koch Jr. purchased the film rights to Gorky Park in 1981 for $250,000. Filming was delayed until February 1983 because of scheduling conflicts with the director John Schlesinger, who would eventually be replaced with Michael Apted, and various cast changes. Dustin Hoffman and Al Pacino were both considered for the role of Arkady Renko before Hurt's casting, while Cary Grant and Burt Lancaster were considered for the role of Jack Osborne and Roman Polanski was considered for the role of Prof. Andreev. The Soviet Communist Party condemned the film as anti-Communist and anti-Russian and denied the crew access to shoot in Moscow. Gorky Park was filmed in Helsinki and Stockholm. The Kaisaniemi public park in the Helsinki centre was set as the Gorky amusement park.

Critical reception
On Rotten Tomatoes, the film has an approval rating of 78% based on reviews from 27 critics, with an average rating of 6.6/10. On Metacritic the film has a score of 60% based on reviews from 12 critics, indicating "mixed or average reviews".

Janet Maslin called it "a taut, clever thriller throughout, with Mr. Apted's direction establishing its intensity immediately and sustaining it well. Ralf G. Bode's cinematography and James Horner's score go a long way toward setting a hauntingly bleak mood, and the supporting players, particularly Brian Dennehy and Ian Bannen, are excellent". Though she found it odd that Hurt would affect an English accent, she found his performance "rivetingly strange".

Roger Ebert found the depiction of Soviet society to be the most interesting aspect of the film, and he credited Apted's direction for never letting the procedural lag. Ebert also praised the casting, even if it relied on typecasting an actor like Marvin. "He uses actors who are able to bring fully realized characters to the screen, so we don't have to stand around waiting for introductions".

Home media
Gorky Park was released to DVD by MGM Home Video on April 1, 2003, as a Region 1 widescreen DVD and to Blu-ray Disc by Kino Lorber (under license from MGM) on October 21, 2014.

References

External links
 
 
 
 

1983 films
Arkady Renko
Edgar Award-winning works
1980s English-language films
Films based on American novels
Films based on crime novels
Films directed by Michael Apted
Films set in Moscow
Films set in the Soviet Union
Films shot in Finland
Orion Pictures films
Films with screenplays by Dennis Potter
Films scored by James Horner
Films shot in Sweden
Films shot in Helsinki
Films shot in Stockholm